Gifted is a one-off British drama thriller television film, written and devised by Kay Mellor, that first broadcast on ITV on 29 October 2003. Starring Kenny Doughty, Claire Goose and Christine Tremarco, the film follows top-flight footballer Jamie Gilliam (Doughty), who is accused of rape by Sharon Harrison (Tremarco), a part-time lap dancer. When Gilliam strongly denies the accusations made against him, Harrison drops the case following intense scrutiny from the press, leading her best friend, Maxine Norris (Goose), to look deeper into the case.

The film was produced by Rollem Productions, and directed by Douglas Mackinnon. 6.19 million viewers tuned in for the initial broadcast. Gifted was released on DVD via IMC Vision on 7 February 2005.

Broadcast
Reports in The Independent in October 2003 suggested that Gifted was under review to be shelved, due to striking similarities with ongoing news stories involving a group of then unidentified Premiership footballers involved in the rape of a seventeen-year-old girl. However, despite these reports, the transmission date was brought forward three weeks, from 19 November to 29 October.

Reception
Carol Midgeley for The Times reviewed Gifted, writing; "What a piece of luck for ITV that Kay Mellor’s drama about a footballer accused of date rape came to fruition just as the alleged gang rape of a 17-year-old girl by a group of Premiership footballers was being splashed across the Sunday papers. Call me a cynic, but I'm guessing the press office was cock-a-hoop. The fact is that no amount of champagne press launches and glossy publicity packs could compete with the real life, gory details of a girl being “roasted” as a way to work up the viewing public's appetite."

Kathryn Flett for The Observer added; "Kay Mellor is a fundamentally fluffy writer. The plot regularly fell apart at its seams, the direction was so emotionally distanced from its subject that it could have been the work of Amanda Burton, many of the key parts were perversely miscast, the char actors were clichés and the dialogue often pathetically girly. n fact, there was so much else that was wrong with Gifted that it is hard to know where to end the criticism, but I'll have a go because I think I've been hard enough."

Cast
 Kenny Doughty as Jamie Gilliam
 Claire Goose as Maxine Norris
 Christine Tremarco as Sharon Harrison
 Paul Popplewell as Sean Dwyer
 David Hayman as Michael Sanderson
 Steve Evets as Mr. Gilliam
 John Benfield as Harry Boothroyd
 Caroline Carver as Faye Steadman
 Andrew Dunn as DC Fairchild
 Bill Fellows as Ian Norris
 John McArdle as Steve Moran
 Kay Mellor as Linda Norris
 Mary Jo Randle as Mrs. Gilliam
 Nick Reding as Adam Gosling
 Joanna Rowden as DS Dickson 
 Abdul Salis as Rowan Angelis
 Pip Torrens as Richard Neilson 
 Richard J Scott as Football Team Captain

References

External links

British thriller television films
English-language television shows
ITV television dramas
2003 television films
2003 films
British thriller drama films
2000s British films